Strenči (pronounced) is a town in Valmiera Municipality in the Vidzeme region of Latvia.

Strenči is known as the raftsmen capital of Latvia, due to the town's location on the Gauja river and historical role in timber rafting.

Strenči is bordered by North Vidzeme Biosphere Reserve.

Twin towns — sister cities

Strenči is twinned with:
 Lainate, Italy
 Rimóc, Hungary
 Rosice, Czech Republic
 Sayda, Germany

See also
List of cities in Latvia

References

Towns in Latvia
1928 establishments in Latvia
Populated places established in 1928
Valmiera Municipality
Kreis Walk
Vidzeme